Agusan del Norte's 2nd congressional district is a congressional district for the House of Representatives of the Philippines in the province of Agusan del Norte. It is one of only two districts in the province in existence since 1987. The district consists of two noncontiguous parts bordering Butuan Bay with the 1st district situated between the two. The northern portion covers the city of Cabadbaran and the municipalities of Jabonga, Kitcharao, Magallanes, Remedios T. Romualdez, Santiago and Tubay, while the municipalities of Buenavista, Carmen and Nasipit comprise its western section. It is currently represented in the 18th Congress by Angelica Amante of the PDP–Laban.

Representation history

Election results

2019

2016

2013

2010

See also
Legislative districts of Agusan del Norte

References

Congressional districts of the Philippines
Politics of Agusan del Norte
1987 establishments in the Philippines
Congressional districts of Caraga
Constituencies established in 1987